Kindred: Neanderthal Life, Love, Death and Art is a 2020 book by Rebecca Wragg Sykes that examines Neanderthals. The book has three "positive" reviews and eight "rave" reviews according to review aggregator Book Marks.

Awards and accolades
2021 Hessell-Tiltman Prize
2021 Current Archaeology Book of the Year Award

References

2020 non-fiction books
English-language books
Anthropology books
Neanderthals
Bloomsbury Publishing books